Monopotassium arsenate is the inorganic compound with the formula KH2AsO4.  A white solid, this salt is used to prepared other arsenic-containing compounds, mainly pesticides. It is prepared by calcining arsenic oxide and potassium nitrate, followed by extraction with water.

Relevant acid-base equilibria for aqueous solutions of this diprotic acid derived from arsenic acid are as follows:
H3AsO4  +  H2O      +  H3O+  (pKa1 = 2.19)
  +  H2O      +  H3O+  (pKa2 = 6.94)

Related compounds
Trisodium arsenate, Na3AsO4
Disodium hydrogen arsenate, Na2HAsO4

References

Arsenates
Potassium compounds